Colin Cunningham, known as Colin Brittain, is an American songwriter and producer signed to Warner Chappell Music.  He has written and produced for acts such as Papa Roach, Hands Like Houses, Basement, Dashboard Confessional, 5 Seconds of Summer, Stick to Your Guns, Miyavi, One Ok Rock, Beautiful Bodies, and Foundry.

Early career
Brittain began his career playing drums in the band Oh No Fiasco. Oh No Fiasco was signed to Five Seven Music where they released their debut EP, No One's Gotta Know.

Discography

References

1986 births
Living people
American male songwriters
Record producers from Tennessee
Songwriters from Tennessee